The Streets is a conceptual and performative work of critical and biographical content by artist Abel Azcona. At the end of 2014 and the early part of 2015, Azcona explored the processual work La Calle ("the sexual exchange") this time in the Santa Fe locality of Bogota, where he prostituted himself on the streets. In this new work, he explored a change towards the figure of his mother, taking hormones and engaging in prostitution. Azcona was inspired by his biological mother, a prostitute, and sought to empathise with her and with the moment of his own conception. The process continued in the cities of Madrid and Mexico City. The performance emerged, as with the rest of his sex-themed works, as an exercise in empathy with his own biological mother. It was also a social critique, where the artist explored the limits of his body by repeating patterns of sexual abuse, which occurred in his own childhood and in the life of his mother.

See also 

 Performance Art
 Installation
 Endurance art
 Prostitution
 Drugs and prostitution

References

Bibliography 
 		
 
 	
 	
 		
 

Performances
Male prostitution in the arts
Works about prostitution in Mexico
Works about prostitution in Colombia
Works about prostitution in Spain